Linosta annulifera is a moth in the family Crambidae. It was described by Eugene G. Munroe in 1959. It is found in Peru and Bolivia.

References

Moths described in 1959
Crambidae